Scott Roskell (born 20 April 1969) is an Australian former professional rugby union and rugby league footballer who played in the 1990s and 2000s.

Roskell joined London Crusaders in August 1992. The club was later renamed to London Broncos, and Roskell went on to play for the club in the first two seasons of the Super League. He left the club in 1997, and switched to rugby union to play for London Welsh.

Roskell scored 86 tries for the Broncos – a club record until it was broken in 2012 by Luke Dorn.

In 2014, Roskell was inducted into London Broncos' Hall of Fame.

References

1969 births
Living people
Australian rugby league players
Australian rugby union players
London Broncos players
London Welsh RFC players
Rugby league wingers
Rugby union centres